Baykurut, United States National Geospatial-Intelligence Agency Township also Baykurt (بايقۇرۇت يېزىسى / Байқурут / Bayinkuluti ) is a township of Wuqia County in Kizilsu Kyrgyz Autonomous Prefecture, Xinjiang Uygur Autonomous Region, China. Baykurut is located in the central to eastern part of the county. It has 2 administrative villages under its jurisdiction. Its seat is at Baykurut Village .

It is adjacent to Terak Township in the east, Artux City and Wuqia Town in the south, Toyun Township in the north. It is bordered by the Kyrghyz Republic with a boundary line of 40 kilometers in the west.

Name
The name Baykurut is derived from the Kyrgyz language. Baykurut was named after Kurut (قۇرۇت / Kuluti, 库鲁提), a rich person who lived in the Baykurut area.

History
Baykurut was the 3rd township of the 4th district in Wuqia County in 1950 and part of Toyun Commune  in 1958, Baykurut Commune was formed from Toyun in 1962.

In 1968 during the Cultural Revolution, the commune was renamed Hongqi Commune  (literally 'Red flag commune'). The original name was restored in 1980.

In 1984, organized as a township in 1984.

Geography

The township's seat is at 2,310 meters above sea level. The highest altitude is 4,200 meters at Karadob, the lowest altitude is 1,900 meters at Topa.

Settlements
The township has 2 administration villages and 5 unincorporated villages under its jurisdiction.

2 administration villages:
 Baykurut Village (Bayinkuluti)
 Kizilagin Village (literally 'red valley' / قىزىل ئېغىن كەنتى / Kezile'agen )

Demographics

, the population of Baykurut was 99.2% Kyrgyz.

Economy
, economically poor persons made up 20.74% of the population of Baykurut and the net mean income in the township was 1,365 RMB.

Transportation
 China-Kyrgyzstan S212 Provincial Highway (中吉公路S212省道) to Torugart Pass

References 

Township-level divisions of Wuqia County